Mountain Creek is a  long 3rd order tributary to Georges Creek in Fayette County, Pennsylvania.

Course
Mountain Creek rises about 4 miles east of Haydentown, Pennsylvania, and then flows westerly to join Georges Creek about 1.5 miles south of Smithfield.

Watershed
Mountain Creek drains  of area, receives about 47.9 in/year of precipitation, has a wetness index of 354.36, and is about 76% forested.

See also
List of rivers of Pennsylvania

References

Rivers of Pennsylvania
Rivers of Fayette County, Pennsylvania
Allegheny Plateau